Karuo District  (other spellings: Karub District, Kharro District (after THL transliteration of Tibetan)) is a district in Qamdo, the district is synonymous referred to as Chamdo, Qamdo, or Chengguan in the Tibet Autonomous Region of China, and the seat of government of Qamdo. Karuo has an area of 10,700 km2 and a population of 78,000, of which 90% are Tibetan. The average temperature is 7.6 °C, with average temperatures of −2.3 °C in January and 16.3 °C in July. The average precipitation is 467 mm per year.

Popular with tourists are the Galden Jampaling Monastery in the capital and the salt mines and hot springs at Yangjing.

Administrative divisions

Karuo administers 3 towns and 12 townships.

See also 

 Chamdo

References 

Chamdo